Al Shabab Sports Club is a Kuwaiti professional football club based in Al Ahmadi. Al Shabab crest demonstrates behavior by picture of the hand shaking, education by the opened book, and sport third by the ball. Al Shabab Club was founded on December 15, 1963, and currently competes in the Kuwait Premier League.

Honours
Kuwaiti Division One: 5
1974–75, 2001–02, 2007–08, 2010–11, 2017–18

Club colours

Current squad

Sponsors
 VIVA Telecom
 Kalleh
 Givova

Shabab
Association football clubs established in 1963
1963 establishments in Kuwait
Sports teams in Kuwait